Michael John Smith may refer to:

 Michael J. Smith (astronaut) (1945–1986), American astronaut
 Michael John Smith (espionage) (born 1948), British engineer convicted of spying for the Soviet Union